Dunabogdány is a village in Pest County, Budapest metropolitan area, Hungary.

The population consisted of 3,198 inhabitants in 2023.

References 

Populated places in Pest County
Budapest metropolitan area
Hungarian German communities